Salvia sikkimensis is a perennial plant that is native to Xizang province in China, along with locations in Bhutan and India (Sikkim). It is typically found growing in and around forests, on hillsides, and streamsides at  elevation.

There are two named varieties. Salvia sikkimensis var. sikkimensis is not very robust and has a campanulate calyx. Salvia campanulata var. chaenocalyx is a robust plant with a funnelform-campanulate calyx.

References

sikkimensis
Flora of China